The 2010–11  Mississippi State Bulldogs men's basketball team represents Mississippi State University in the 2010–11 college basketball season. This is head coach Rick Stansbury's thirteenth season at Mississippi State. The Bulldogs compete in the Southeastern Conference and play their home games at Humphrey Coliseum, nicknamed The Hump.

Roster

Schedule

|-
!colspan=9 style=| Exhibition

|-
!colspan=9 style=| Non-conference regular season

|-
!colspan=9 style=| SEC regular season

|-
!colspan=9 style=| 2011 SEC Tournament

References

Mississippi State Bulldogs men's basketball seasons
Mississippi State
Bull
Bull